The Men's 20 km Walk at the 2003 World Championships in Paris, France was held on 23 August 2003, with the start at 08.30h local time.

Medalists

Abbreviations
All times shown are in hours:minutes:seconds

Records

Intermediates

Final ranking

See also
Athletics at the 2003 Pan American Games - Men's 20 kilometres walk
2003 Race Walking Year Ranking

References
Results
Die Leichtathletik-Statistik-Seite

H
Racewalking at the World Athletics Championships